The Atlantic County Courthouse is the historical courthouse for Atlantic County, New Jersey located in the county seat of Mays Landing, which is part of Hamilton Township. It now houses the Office of County Clerk. The Atlantic County Sheriff's Office and older county jails are behind the building.

The building was originally constructed in 1838 and expanded over the years  It was renovated in 2010. It is a contributing property to the Mays Landing Historic District listed in 1990 on the New Jersey Register of Historic Places (#338) and the National Register of Historic Places (#90001245).

The building has been superseded by the Atlantic County Criminal Courts Complex, (1978) also in Mays Landing
and the Atlantic County Civil Courts Complex in Atlantic City, which are part of the 1st vicinage.

See also
County courthouses in New Jersey
Federal courthouses in New Jersey
Richard J. Hughes Justice Complex
National Register of Historic Places listings in Atlantic County, New Jersey

References 

County courthouses in New Jersey
Government buildings completed in 1838
1838 establishments in New Jersey
Hamilton Township, Atlantic County, New Jersey
National Register of Historic Places in Atlantic County, New Jersey
New Jersey Register of Historic Places
Courthouses on the National Register of Historic Places in New Jersey
Buildings and structures in Atlantic County, New Jersey
Historic district contributing properties in New Jersey